Ohio's 30th senatorial district has historically been based in the Ohio Valley.  It now consists of large swaths of eastern and southeastern Ohio and includes the counties of Carroll, Jefferson, Harrison, Belmont, Noble, Monroe, Washington and Meigs as well as portions of Athens and Vinton counties.  It encompasses Ohio House of Representatives districts 94, 95 and 96.  It has a Cook PVI of D+6.  Its current Ohio Senator is Republican Frank Hoagland.  He resides in Adena, a city located in Jefferson County.

List of senators

External links
Ohio's 30th district senator at the 130th Ohio General Assembly official website

Ohio State Senate districts